Vistigma is a genus of skippers in the family Hesperiidae.

Species
Recognised species in the genus Vistigma include:
 Vistigma bryanti (Weeks, 1906)

References

Natural History Museum Lepidoptera genus database

Hesperiidae
Hesperiidae genera